Greenfields railway station is located on the Gawler line.

History

The station opened in 1969 as Green Field, later changing to Greenfields.

It is one of only two stations on the Gawler Central line to have a pedestrian underpass (the other is Parafield Gardens). The other stations have had theirs closed due to concerns with safety and vandalism. To the west of the station lies the Australian Rail Track Corporation standard gauge line to Crystal Brook.

In 2021 it has received several upgrades including a deep cleaning, fresh coat of paint, LED lighting and new bins. This is apart of the State governments station refresh program.

Services by platform

References

External links

Railway stations in Adelaide
Railway stations in Australia opened in 1969